Edward Cucuel (August 6, 1875, San Francisco – April 18, 1954, Pasadena, California), was an American-born painter who lived and worked in Germany.

Life and work
He was the son of a German newspaper publisher. At the age of fourteen he was already attending the San Francisco Art Institute and doing illustrations for The Examiner. At the age of seventeen, he went to Paris where he attended the Académie Julian and the Académie Colarossi, finishing at the Académie des Beaux-Arts under Jean-Léon Gérôme. When he came back to the United States in 1896, he briefly worked as a newspaper illustrator in New York, but returned to France and Italy to acquaint himself with the old masters at first hand. He ended up in Germany in 1899, where he worked as a free-lance newspaper illustrator in Berlin and Leipzig.

In 1904, after working as a reporter at the St. Louis World's Fair, he decided to take a trip around the world, visiting Japan, China and Sri Lanka. Following a brief stay in San Francisco to visit his family after the earthquake, he settled in Munich in 1907. It was there that he became a friend of the German painter, Leo Putz, and was introduced to plein-air painting. He also became a member of the Munich Secession. In 1913, he became a member of the Société Nationale des Beaux-Arts and exhibited with the Salon d'Automne. That same year, he married Clara Lotte von Marcard, a friend of Putz and his wife, Frieda Blell. During the First World War, he lived in Holzhausen on the Ammersee, later establishing studios in Munich and Starnberg, his father's hometown. From 1928 to 1939, he commuted between there and New York, where he spent the winters. The beginning of World War II forced him to leave Germany for good in 1939. He settled in Pasadena, California, where he lived until his death in 1954.

His style was generally impressionistic and his favorite subjects were idyllic outdoor scenes with young women. His works may be seen at the Chicago Art Institute, the National Academy in New York, and the Carnegie Institute of Pittsburgh, as well as many other places in the U.S. and Europe.

References

Further reading
Bruckmanns Lexikon der Münchner Kunst. Münchner Maler im 19./20. Jahrhundert (Geburtsjahrgänge 1871–1900), edited by Horst Ludwig, Vol. 5: Achmann-Kursell, Munich 1993, S. 162
Fritz von Ostini: Der Maler Edward Cucuel, Zürich/Vienna/Leipzig 1924
Hans Vollmer: Edward Cucuel, in: Allgemeines Lexikon der bildenden Künstler des XX. Jahrhunderts, Vol. 1: A-D, Leipzig 1953, Reprint Munich 1992, S. 500

External links
The Athenaeum: Edward Cucuel's self-portrait
Tutt'Art@: Works by Cucuel

1875 births
1954 deaths
Expatriates from the United States in the German Empire
Impressionism
20th-century American painters
American male painters
École des Beaux-Arts alumni
Académie Julian alumni
Académie Colarossi alumni
20th-century American male artists